Transfer Day is a holiday celebrated in the U.S. Virgin Islands on March 31.  It marks the transfer of the islands from Denmark to the United States that took place in 1917. The islands were initially held by various European countries, and were under the sole control of Denmark by 1754. Transfer Day could have taken place years earlier, but due to the construction and funding of the Panama Canal, the United States Senate rejected negotiations. Following money shortages from war, and the potential German invasion of Denmark, both sides saw the exchange as mutually beneficial. Transfer Day is now celebrated in a variety of ways on the various islands including parades, parties, and reenactment of the original Transfer Day itself.

Danish control 
The Virgin Islands were exploited by numerous European countries after Christopher Columbus discovered the islands in 1493, land previously unknown to the East. The Virgin Islands and the natives were subject to the negative externalities of imperialism and colonialism. A number of European countries occupied the Virgin Islands including France, Britain, Spain, and most importantly Denmark. While all of the countries listed exploited the VI in some form, Denmark had the most impact due to their control over the islands. After gaining full control of the islands in 1754, purchased from the Danish West Indian Company, the Danish began to exploit the land by setting up a sugar industry. This sugar industry also used slave labor to increase production. When the sugar industry became less profitable, "the Danish West Indies continued throughout the 19th century to enjoy a commercial boom as a free port and as a coaling station in the days of sailing vessels and paddle steamers."

At the time of the US purchase of the Danish West Indies in 1917, the colony did not include Water Island, which had been sold by Denmark to the East Asiatic Company, a private shipping company, in 1905. The company eventually sold the island to the United States in 1944, during the German occupation of Denmark. The federal government then used the island for military purposes until 1950, before finally transferring it to the territorial government in 1996.

Transfer Day 
The Virgin Islands were of long interest of the United States, "…but as far back as the Civil War the U.S. was aware of their value as a possible U.S. Naval depot, commanding as they do the most important sea approaches from the Atlantic to the Caribbean". Following the decline of the sugar industry, the Danish began to have interest in selling the islands, but the United States senate was disinterested in the deal because of the building of the Panama Canal which significantly affect global trade and specifically United States Trade. Years later, there was mutual interest due to the fact that Denmark was struggling financially from war with Prussia and Austria, the United States had interest because Denmark was under threat of German invasion which caused fear that the Germans would then inhabit the Virgin Islands. In January 1917, the United States would agree to purchase the Virgin Islands for "$25 million ($295 per acre), then regarded as an exorbitant sum for land that amounted to hardly more than a tenth of the size of Rhode Island, the smallest state.". The first Transfer Day celebration/ceremony occurred on March 31, 1917.

The news was immediately telegraphed to New York, then cabled to San Juan, Puerto Rico, flashed by wireless to the cruiser Hancock in the harbor at Charlotte Amalie, and carried ashore to St. Thomas via rowboat. There, Danish and American honor guards in white uniforms stood in formation on opposite sides of the parade ground before red-walled Fort Christian. Once the message had been delivered, at 4:48 p.m, the Danish honor guard presented arms, the Danish national anthem was played, and a cannon boomed 21 times as the red and white Danish flag was slowly lowered for the final time after 251 years of Danish rule. At 4:53 p.m. the American honor guard presented arms, a band played the "Star-Spangled Banner," and to the roar of the cannon the American flag was raised. As a last gesture, Admiral Henri Konow of Denmark and Admiral Edwin T. Pollock of the United States Navy drew their ceremonial swords.

The Virgin Islands now have annual celebrations in honor of transfer day. According to a St. Croix website, "Transfer Day is commemorated annually with a military parade and various ceremonies and cultural events across all of the islands". The celebration varies by year, for example in 1987, "A reenactment of the transfer will begin at 4 p.m. Tuesday on the lawns of the 1874 lime-green, white-shuttered Legislature building. That's the precise time the event originally occurred on March 31, 1917". In addition to reenacting the transfer, the Danish also replicated their departure, "The 196-foot-long, three-masted, full-rigged Danish government training ship Danmark has sailed here from Copenhagen especially for the celebration. The Danmark 80 cadets and 18 officers will represent the officers and crew of the Danish cruiser Valkyrien which in 1917 carried back to Denmark the last Danish governor and his official party".

Key actors 
Constantin Brun, a Danish royal administrator and merchant, was in Washington D.C. on Transfer Day as representative of Denmark accepting payment for the Virgin Islands on behalf of  President Woodrow Wilson. Following payment, various telegraphs were sent to the islands in order to inform them of the sale. As mentioned previously, a final act of respect would be displayed by Admiral Henri Konow of Denmark and Admiral Edwin T. Pollock of the United States Navy.

In popular culture 
The holiday is the subject of Sophie Schiller's 2012 novel Transfer Day.

Gallery

References

External links 
Transfer Day, Royal Danish Consulate, U.S. Virgin Islands
Article and video concerning Transfer Day (in Danish)

Public holidays in the United States Virgin Islands
History of the United States Virgin Islands
March observances
1917 in the United States Virgin Islands